Henry Francis "Farmer" Vaughn (March 1, 1864 – February 21, 1914) was an American professional baseball catcher. He played in Major League Baseball for the Cincinnati Red Stockings, Louisville Colonels, New York Giants, Cincinnati Kelly's Killers, Milwaukee Brewers and Cincinnati Reds. He was born in Ruraldale, Ohio.

In 13 seasons, he played in 915 games and had 3,454 at bats, 474 runs, 946 hits, 147 doubles, 53 triples, 21 home runs, 525 RBI, 92 stolen bases, 151 walks, .274 batting average, .307 on-base percentage, .365 slugging percentage and 1,262 total bases.

He died in Cincinnati, Ohio, at the age of 49.

Sources

1864 births
1914 deaths
19th-century baseball players
Major League Baseball catchers
Cincinnati Red Stockings (AA) players
Louisville Colonels players
New York Giants (PL) players
Cincinnati Kelly's Killers players
Milwaukee Brewers (AA) players
Cincinnati Reds players
New Orleans Pelicans (baseball) players
Memphis Grays players
St. Paul Apostles players
St. Paul Saints (Western League) players
Peoria Distillers players
Milwaukee Creams players
Birmingham Barons managers
Baseball players from Ohio
People from Muskingum County, Ohio